The Hand in Hand Fire & Life Insurance Society was one of the oldest British insurance companies.

History
The company was founded in 1696 at Tom's Coffee House in St Martin's Lane in London. It was one of three fire insurance companies started after the Great Fire of London, and it was initially called the Contributors for Insuring Houses, Chambers or Rooms from Loss by Fire, by Amicable Contribution. In 1905, the Hand in Hand was acquired by the Commercial Union Group.

References

Companies based in the City of Westminster
Insurance companies of the United Kingdom
Financial services companies established in 1696
Financial services companies disestablished in 1905
Financial services companies established in the 17th century
1696 establishments in England
British companies disestablished in 1905